Sir John Pennycuick (6 November 1899 – 14 January 1982) was an English barrister and judge.  He was a High Court judge from 1960 to 1974, and Vice-Chancellor of the Chancery Division from the recreation of the office in 1970 until 1974.

Pennycuick was the only son of the British Army officer and engineer Colonel John Pennycuick, CSI (1841–1911). His father was the tenth of the eleven children of Brigadier John Pennycuick  (1789–1849), who was killed in the Battle of Chillianwala in the Second Anglo-Sikh War.

He was educated at Winchester College and New College, Oxford, and became a second lieutenant in the Coldstream Guards in 1919.  He was called to the bar at Inner Temple in 1925, where later he became a bencher in 1954 and was Treasurer in 1978.  He became a Queen's Counsel in 1947.

He was appointed as a High Court judge in 1960, in the Chancery Division, and received the customary knighthood.  Pennycuick became the first modern Vice-Chancellor in July 1970 when the office was revived to replace the title of "Senior Judge" for the head of the Chancery Division.  He was appointed as a Privy Counsellor in the Queen's Birthday Honours List in June 1974, and retired as a full-time Chancery judge in September 1974, although he continued to sit as a judge occasionally.

He married Lucy Johnstone in 1930, and they had one son and one daughter.  His wife predeceased him in 1972.

References 
 Obituary in The Times, 15 January 1982, p. 10.
 Portrait from the National Portrait Gallery

Members of the Privy Council of the United Kingdom
1899 births
1982 deaths
Chancery Division judges
Knights Bachelor
People educated at Winchester College
Alumni of New College, Oxford
Coldstream Guards officers
Members of the Inner Temple
English King's Counsel
20th-century English lawyers